Central Bengkulu is a regency of Bengkulu Province, Indonesia. It is located on the island of Sumatra, and was formed by being split away from the neighbouring North Bengkulu Regency. It covers an area of 1,223.94 km2 and had a population of 98,333 at the 2010 census and 116,706 at the 2020 census.

Administrative districts

At the time of the 2010 census, the regency was divided into ten districts (kecamatan), but an eleventh district (Semidang Lagan) was added subsequently. The districts are detailed below with their areas and their populations at the 2010 census and the 2020 census. The table includes the locations of the district administrative centre, and the number of villages (rural desa and urban kelurahan) in each district.

References

Regencies of Bengkulu